Pieneman is a surname. Notable people with the surname include:

Jan Willem Pieneman (1779–1853), Dutch painter
Nicolaas Pieneman (1809–1860), Dutch painter, art collector, lithographer, and sculptor
Nicolaas Pieneman (1880-1938), Dutch artist